The National State Federation (FNS) was a trade union representing civil servants in Italy.

The union was founded in 1945, and affiliated to the recently formed Italian General Confederation of Labour.  By 1954, it had 68,699 members.  In 1980, it merged with the National Federation of Local Authority and Healthcare Workers and the Italian Federation of Public Sector Workers, to form Public Function.

General Secretaries
1945: Cesare Pilia
1955: Ugo Vetere
1971: Antonio De Angelis

References

Civil service trade unions
Trade unions established in 1945
Trade unions disestablished in 1980
Trade unions in Italy